House of Drag is a New Zealand reality competition television series produced by Warner Bros. International TV Production New Zealand for TVNZ OnDemand and OutTV. It debuted on 15 November 2018 on TVNZ OnDemand. It is hosted by New Zealand drag queens, Kita Mean and Anita Wigl'it. Season 2 premiered on 1 February 2020.

The first season saw nine contestants – eight drag queens and one drag king – undertake a series of "awkwardly fabulous" challenges. The contestant who won each week had the power to select two fellow contestants who they believe should be in the bottom for that week. Kita Mean and Anita Wigl'it then decided who would "have their light dimmed" and be sent home. The contestants competed to be crowned the winner of The House of Drag, take home a prize of $10,000, a 55" LG Smart LED TV and one year of free broadband, courtesy of the show's sponsor Chorus Limited.

Series overview

Season 1

Contestants
Ages, names, and cities stated are at time of filming.

Contestant progress

Episodes

Season 2

Contestants
Ages, names, and cities stated are at time of filming.

Contestant progress

Episodes

References 

New Zealand reality television series
2018 New Zealand television series debuts
New Zealand LGBT-related television shows
Drag (clothing) television shows
2010s LGBT-related reality television series
2020s LGBT-related reality television series